Spring Day is a 2005 South Korean television drama series starring Go Hyun-jung, Zo In-sung, and Ji Jin-hee. Loosely adapted from the 1995 Japanese drama , it aired on SBS from January 8 to March 13, 2005, on Saturdays and Sundays at 21:45 for 20 episodes.

The series marked Go Hyun-jung's acting comeback 10 years after she retired from the entertainment industry upon marriage to a chaebol (they divorced in 2003). Largely due to Go, Spring Day became the 5th most popular Korean drama of 2005 with an average viewer rating of 30 percent.

Synopsis
Go Eun-ho (Ji Jin-hee), a doctor from Seoul, goes to Biyang Island to meet his father's mentor. There, he meets Seo Jung-eun (Go Hyun-jung), a silent, elusive beauty who has suffered a trauma so great that she's lost the will to speak. Fascinated and empathetic, Eun-ho helps Jung-eun find a way to overcome her past. But just when her gratitude starts to blossom into love, fate cruelly intervenes, leaving Eun-ho in a coma, caused by a car accident when driving with his long-lost mother, who died at the scene.

At the hospital, Jung-eun meets Eun-ho's stepbrother Eun-sup (Zo In-sung), who is also a doctor. Despite his best intentions, Eun-sup finds himself powerless to resist Jung-eun, and he falls for her as Eun-ho lies comatose. Later, Eun-ho does regain consciousness, but his state of mind is stuck in childhood. Little by little, he begins to regain his memory. One day as he intercepts a car, he starts to recall the past and understand that his unacknowledged pain and fear of cars resulted from his mother's death. Jung-eun, fed up with hiding the truth, tells him the shocking news that his mother died in a car accident.

Latent rivalries and misunderstandings come to a boil as the two brothers fight for Jung-eun's affection, with other opposing characters making matters worse. A bar girl and Kim Min-jung both despise Jung-eun for stealing the hearts of Eun-sup and Eun-ho, respectively. Eun-sup's mother also shows disdain for Jung-eun, since she sees Jung-eun's grandfather, her husband's mentor, as a threat to her marriage. Spiteful that Eun-ho desires to marry Jung-eun, Eun-sup's mother contemplates a plan using Min-jung to poison their relationship. Min-jung visits Jung-eun, deceitfully telling her that she is hindering Eun-ho from a successful career by furthering his studies at the prestigious Johns Hopkins School of Medicine, which his family wants for him. Believing this, Jung-eun breaks off her engagement to Eun-ho, and leaves him.

Eun-sup one day sees the phony medical school pamphlet that Min-jung presented to Jung-eun, and tells Eun-ho about it. Min-jung admits her scheme to Eun-ho, saying it was done out of her love for him. Eun-ho confronts Jung-eun and tells her about the misunderstanding, but Jung-eun refuses to reconcile. She then confesses that her heart loves Eun-sup, not him. After Eun-sup learns that Jung-eun loves him back, they spend more time together before she goes back to Biyang Island. In the end, Eun-ho decides to forget his feelings for Jung-eun and forces himself to like Min-jung. The two brothers are reconciled. Eun-sup leaves Seoul to become a doctor at the Biyang Health Center, while living with Jung-eun on the island. The ending scene recalls the drama's opening scene as Jung-eun runs to the ferry to reunite with her love, who is now Eun-sup.

Cast
 Go Hyun-jung as Seo Jung-eun
 Jang Ah-young as young Seo Jung-eun
 Zo In-sung as Go Eun-sup
 Ji Jin-hee as Go Eun-ho
 Han Go-eun as Kim Min-jung
 Shin Choong-shik as Seo Dal-ho (Jung-eun's grandfather)
 Jang Yong as Go Hyung-jin (Eun-sup's and Eun-ho's father)
 Lee Hwi-hyang as Oh Hye-rim (Eun-sup's mother)
 Park Chul-min as Lee Jin-tae
 Lee So-yeon as Kim Kyung-ah (bar girl)
 Lee Kyung-jin as Eun-ho's mother (piano teacher)
 Park Jung-woo as Sung-joon
 Jo Eun-sook as Yoon-sook (runaway mother)
 Oh Ji-hye
 Lee Hyun-woo
 Jung Jong-joon as gang boss

References

External links 
  
 
 

2005 South Korean television series debuts
2005 South Korean television series endings
Seoul Broadcasting System television dramas
Korean-language television shows
South Korean romance television series
Television series by IHQ (company)